Malekith the Accursed is a fictional character appearing in American comic books published by Marvel Comics. He is the ruler of the Dark Elves of Svartalfheim, and has come into conflict with Thor. He once wielded the Casket of Ancient Winters.

Christopher Eccleston portrayed the character in the Marvel Cinematic Universe film Thor: The Dark World (2013).

Publication history
Created by Walt Simonson, Malekith first appeared in Thor #344–349 (June–November 1984). He subsequently appeared in issues #363 (January 1986), 366-368 (April–June 1986), 485–487 (April–June 1995), and 489 (August 1995) of Thor.

He made guest appearances in X-Force and Cable Annual 1997 and Heroes for Hire #14 (August 1998) before again battling Thor in Thor vol. 2 #29-32 (November 2000–February 2001). He later appeared in The Incredible Hercules #134 (November 2009) and #136 (December 2009).

In 2012, Jason Aaron revived him in the Thor: God of Thunder series and he became the main antagonist in the "All New, All Different" Thor volume 4 and the crossover event War on the Realms.

Fictional character biography
Malekith grew up during a time of war in Svartalfheim. Twelve of his older brothers died during a war with the trolls. His mother eventually sold him for two sacks of snake livers and half a barrel of pickled toads. He worked as a body burner, who cremated bodies after a battle, until he was captured by trolls. In his prison he met a wizard, who helped him escape and took him as an apprentice. Eventually the Wizard wanted to combine their powers for peace, but Malekith refused because he felt that any peace would mean that the war which forged him would have been pointless, making his existence something which wasn't meant to be. He then killed the wizard, who before dying scarred his face, and then his mother, taking the dogs of the Wild Hunt.

Later, Malekith struck an alliance with Loki on behalf of the fire demon Surtur. He took control of a number of Earth humans using special food of the faerie provided by Hela. Malekith then killed Eric Willis, guardian of the Casket of Ancient Winters, after learning its location. As Master of the Hounds, Malekith hunted down Roger Willis, Eric's son and new guardian of the Casket. Malekith battled Thor, and kidnapped Lorelei. Using Lorelei as bait, Malekith forced Thor to battle Algrim the Strong, one of his Dark Elf followers, then attempted to destroy both combatants by plunging them into a pool of magma. He then captured the Casket of Ancient Winters from Roger Willis. Malekith was ultimately defeated by Thor, but not before he destroyed the Casket of Ancient Winters, releasing magical frigid force all over the Earth. Malekith was then brought as a captive by Thor to Asgard.

Malekith later disguised Loki as himself to take his place in the dungeon, while he disguised himself as Balder, who was about to be crowned ruler of Asgard. Kurse, the being formerly known as Algrim, saw through Malekith's disguise when he reached Asgard City. Kurse then broke Malekith's neck, apparently slaying him.

Years later, Malekith was revealed to be alive once again. Disguising himself as Balder again, he enlisted Hercules to attack Alflyse, the Dark Elf Queen of the Eastern Spires, while disguised as Thor. His scheme unraveled (partially due to the appearance of Thor disguised as Hercules), and he was easily defeated by Zeus.

Malekith has resurfaced again intent on collecting Mandarin's rings. The other ring-bearing hosts were later to meet their demise or mutilation at the hands of Malekith. In the storyline "Rings of the Mandarin", it is revealed that after reclaiming his kingdom Svartalfheim he was approached by a ring seeking a host, but bent its will to his rather than letting it control his mind. He has now begun a campaign to attack all other "Mandarins" and take their rings, desiring "the full set" before attacking Tony Stark. Though he is usually a foe of Thor and other magical beings, his opposition to Iron Man is rooted in Elves' traditional weakness towards iron.

Malekith, who escaped from his prison in Niffleheim, rampages across the Nine Realms in a path of revenge, targeting any Dark Elf who isn't loyal to him. Despite this fratricide, the Dark Elf Council ends up electing him as his king, as Dark Elves respect those they fear. However, the opposition to Malekith had drawn together the other races of the realms, causing a new level of understanding and cooperation. The enemies of the realms made note of this and drew together as well.

Malekith the Accursed later causes Thor to lose his left arm in combat after a woman (later revealed to be Jane Foster) lifted Mjolnir and gained Thor's powers. Malekith's plans crossed over with the Minotaur of Roxxon's desires for more power sources. Malekith and Minotaur came to a deal: Dario would give him the Skull of Laufey in exchange of the mineral rights of all realms Malekith conquers. Thor appeared in the roof of Roxxon Island to stop their deal, but she was attacked by the Serpent who was possessing the Destroyer Armor. The Serpent threw Thor out of Roxxon Island and they continued battling in the oil fields below. After flying away, Malekith convinced Minotaur to celebrate their deal in the Dark Elf way and he teleported the two of them to Alfheim where they slaughtered various Light Elves. Then Malekith and Minotaur went to Jotunheim. Using the blood of a hundred murdered Light Elves, Malekith performed a spell that resurrected King Laufey.

As part of the All-New, All-Different Marvel event, Malekith the Accursed appears as a member of the Dark Council alongside Minotaur, Ulik, Laufey, and some unnamed Fire Demons. As before, Malekith is focusing on murdering Light Elves.

During the "War of the Realms" storyline, Malekith begins his invasion of Midgard by posing as Loki and tricking Thor into heading to Jotunheim. In addition, he did send some Dark Elf assassins after Odin. During the battle in New York, Malekith arrives with his Dark Council (consisting of Enchantress, Kurse, Ulik, Minotaur, and a Svartalheim Bog Tiger). After Loki saves Frigga from Laufey, he fights Malekith before Doctor Strange teleports him away. When Doctor Strange tries to do magic, it is revealed that Malekith hired a coven of War Witches which prevents Doctor Strange from using his full power. After Valkyrie buys Doctor Strange time to get everyone away, she is beheaded by Malekith. Malekith lays destruction over Europe and plans to slay Black Knight, Union Jack, and Spitfire with the Ebony Blade, when Captain Marvel arrives with her War Avengers (consisting of Deadpool, Weapon H, Winter Soldier, Captain Britain, Sif and the Venom symbiote) to fight against Malekith. As the War Avengers fight the Dark Elves, the Venom Symbiote tries to attack Malekith only to be absorbed into his sword. Malekith tortures the Venom symbiote and tries to tame it as he uses a dagger of living abyss on the Venom symbiote to reshape it into Knull's All-Black designed to kill the Asgardians. Malekith is gleeful that his forces are causing chaos around Earth. Frigga is busy fighting off the endless hordes when Malekith throws the Venom symbiote as a spear at Frigga's stomach. Before he could kill her, Odin arrives in his new armor and buys time for Frigga to destroy the Black Bifrost Bridge where its blast seemingly kills them both while defeating Malekith's forces. It turns out that Odin and Frigga survived where Malekith the Accursed is torturing them with the Venom symbiote at Stonehenge. When Odin shouts to Thor not to rescue them as it is a trap, Malekith stabs him to keep him quiet. Knowing that the Thor Corps is approaching, Malekith the Accursed augments his acolytes with the Venom symbiote and then bonds with it. Frigga states to Malekith that he should flee while he still can as Malekith plans to cause the death of Thor. Odin tells Frigga to pray to Thor. When the Thor Corps arrive, Malekith uses the Venom symbiote's powers to grow wings as he declares himself the Butcher of Thors. Malekith coats Thor's golden hammer with the Venom symbiote and dubs it the Black Hammer of the Accursed. As Malekith tries to impale Jane Foster with his tongue, Thor goes into his berserker state and throws himself into Malekith as the other Thors sense the powers of the God Tempest. The younger Thor from the 6th Century cuts off Malekith's arm as Thor urges Malekith to surrender only for him to summon the Wild Hunt. However, the Wild Hunt Hounds and the Svartlheim Bog Tiger are eyeing Malekith with a hungry look as they dismember him.

Afterwards, Malekith finds himself in Niffleheim where Hela and Karnilla greet him and reveal that his Wild Hunt hounds and the Svartalheim Bog Tiger also died soon after devouring him where they have been poisoned by the black magic he had used to bend the Venom symbiote to his will. Karnilla explains that when they reassembled the pieces of his soul they had drawn out of the beast's stomachs, they had found the last fragment of his true self—the little boy who had suffered through his childhood as a victim of war. Hela and Karnilla tell a horrified Malekith that his punishment will be to witness his younger self spend eternity with the hounds and the Svartalheim Bog Tiger. He is then chained to a rock with his eyes sewn open by Karnilla. As Malekith begs for mercy, the Wild Hunt hounds and the Svartalheim Bog Tiger are sent through a portal to Valhalla where they are transformed into puppies and a tiger cub respectively. They are then seen happily playing with the young Malekith. As the young Malekith has finally found peace and happiness, Malekith screams at the torment of having to watch for all eternity.

Powers and abilities
Malekith has all the normal attributes of a member of the race of dark elves, although his abilities are a result of above-average development. He possesses superhuman intellect, strength, speed, stamina, durability, agility and reflexes.

As a dark elf, Malekith also has the ability to manipulate the forces of magic for a variety of effects, including teleportation, energy projection, physical malleability, flight (by transforming into mist), illusion casting, and the ability to change the shape and appearance of other beings or objects.

Malekith, like all Dark Elves, has a vulnerability to iron, which disrupts or cancels his magical spells.

Other versions

Marvel Adventures imprint

Malekith appeared in an issue of Marvel Adventures: The Avengers where he tries to take over Asgard with the help of the Frost Giants, but he was defeated with the combined efforts of the Avengers, Thor, and many other Asgardian warriors.

In other media

Television
 Malekith the Accursed appears in The Avengers: Earth's Mightiest Heroes episode "The Casket of Ancient Winters", voiced by Quinton Flynn. After being partially resurrected by Loki, Malekith forms an alliance with him to seek out the titular casket before betraying him to access its power in an attempt to create an endless winter in Midgard, only to be stopped by Thor, Iron Man, and the Black Panther.
 Malekith the Accursed appears in the Hulk and the Agents of S.M.A.S.H. episode "For Asgard", voiced by James C. Mathis III. This version of Malekith and his Dark Elves were inspired to conquer other worlds due to lacking a homeworld of their own.

Film

 Malekith the Accursed makes a cameo appearance in Hulk vs Thor.
 Malekith appears  in Thor: The Dark World, portrayed by Christopher Eccleston. Millennia prior, this version led the Dark Elves in a war against the Asgardians using the Aether, but were defeated and presumed dead following a final battle against King Bor, who sealed the Aether. Having gone into hiding, the Dark Elves resurface in the present amidst a convergence event when Jane Foster inadvertently becomes infected with the Aether. In their quest to reclaim the Aether and plunge the universe in eternal darkness, they lay siege to Asgard, killing Frigga. Despite being scarred by Bor's grandson Thor, Malekith eventually succeeds in extracting the Aether from Foster and fusing with it, only to be defeated and killed by Thor via a teleportation device Erik Selvig built.

Video games
 Malekith the Accursed appears as a boss in Marvel: Avengers Alliance.
 Malekith the Accursed appears in Marvel Heroes.
 Malekith the Accursed appears in Lego Marvel Super Heroes, voiced by Stephen Stanton.
 Malekith, based on the Thor: The Dark World incarnation, appears in Thor: The Dark World: The Official Game, voiced by Marc Thompson.
 Malekith appears as a playable character in Marvel: Future Fight.
 The Thor: The Dark World incarnation of Malekith appears in Lego Marvel's Avengers. 
 Malekith appears as a boss in Marvel Future Revolution, voiced by Jason Spisak.

Miscellaneous
Malekith appears in the motion comic War of the Realms: Marvel Ultimate Comics'', voiced by Mackenzie Gray.

References

External links
 Malekith at Marvel.com
 

Characters created by Walt Simonson
Comics characters introduced in 1984
Fictional characters with superhuman durability or invulnerability
Fictional elves
Male characters in film
Marvel Comics characters who are shapeshifters
Marvel Comics characters who can move at superhuman speeds
Marvel Comics characters who use magic
Marvel Comics characters with superhuman strength
Marvel Comics male supervillains
Thor (Marvel Comics)